Fire in the Maternity Ward is a 2019 Netflix stand-up comedy special by American comic Anthony Jeselnik, his second Netflix stand-up special after Anthony Jeselnik: Thoughts and Prayers. In Fire in the Maternity Ward, directed by Shannon Hartman in New York City, Anthony Jeselnik talks about his grandmother's dementia, dropping babies and more.

Cast
 Anthony Jeselnik

Release
Anthony Jeselnik: Fire in the Maternity Ward was released on April 30, 2019 on Netflix streaming.

References

External links
 
 
 

2019 television specials
Netflix specials
Stand-up comedy concert films
2019 comedy films